Troublesome Night 19 is a 2003 Hong Kong horror comedy film produced by Nam Yin and directed by Yip Wai-ying. It is the 19th installment in the Troublesome Night film series.

Plot
Audrey finds a pair of sunglasses at the beach. That night, she dreams about a girl who was murdered on the beach. After consulting the expert ghostbuster Mrs. Bud Lung, Audrey learns that the ghost wants to tell her about her fate. Mrs. Bud urges Audrey to return the sunglasses back to where she found them. She becomes unconscious and experiences a vision of the entire murder. While having dinner later, Audrey recognises Lee Ka-hing, a famous tycoon, as the murderer. She allows the victim's ghost to possess her and force Lee to confess.

Cast
 Law Lan as Mrs. Bud Lung
 Simon Lui as Bud Pit
 Anita Chan as Audrey
 Ronnie Cheung as Bud Yan
 Ken Wong as Lee Ka-hing
 Yum Kong-sau as mysterious woman
 Tong Ka-fai as Bud Gay
 Lam Wai-yin as man inflating rubber boat
 Michelle Wong as Wan
 Baat Leung-gam as Pat
 Mr Nine as Lai Chor-kau
 Onitsuka as Lai Chor-pat

External links
 
 

2003 comedy horror films
2003 films
Hong Kong comedy horror films
2000s Cantonese-language films
Troublesome Night (film series)
2000s Hong Kong films